The Vickers Vulcan was a British single-engine biplane airliner of the 1920s built by Vickers Limited at Brooklands Aerodrome, Surrey. It carried eight passengers and a pilot.

Development
The Vickers Vulcan was designed by Rex Pierson of Vickers. It first flew in April 1922 at the hands of chief test pilot, S. Cockerell, at Brooklands Aerodrome in Surrey, UK.

The Vulcan was based on a civil version of the Vimy bomber, but featured many changes, including a much larger, taller fuselage and one, instead of two, Rolls-Royce Eagle VIII engines, the intention being low operating costs. The shape of its fuselage, as well as its flying characteristics, earned it the nickname "Flying Pig". The first delivery took place in August 1922, to Instone Air Line Ltd. Other operators included Imperial Airways and Qantas (however, the latter returned the aircraft as their performance was too poor for the company's needs). The last Vulcan flying was a Type 74 with Imperial Airways. It  crashed in July 1928 while on a test flight from Croydon Airport.

Variants
 Type 61 - first production version, five built.
 Type 63 - cargo version based on the Type 61, one built
 Type 68 - proposed colonial variant with an Eagle VIII engine, not built.
 Type 74 - upgraded to 450 hp Napier Lion engine, two built
 Type 86 - proposed all-metal variant with an Eagle VIII engine, not built.

Operators
 
Qantas

Imperial Airways
Instone Air Line

Accidents and incidents
 G-EBEM (Type 61) Disappeared off the coast of Italy in May 1926.
 G-EBLB (Type 74) crashed during a test flight from Croydon Airport at Purley July 1928.

Specifications (Vulcan Type 74)

See also

References

Sources
 Andrews, C.F and Morgan, E.B. Vickers Aircraft since 1908. London:Putnam, 1988. .

External links
The Vickers "Vulcan" Eight-passenger Commercial Biplane Flight 4 May 1922 p253-258

1920s British airliners
Vulcan
Biplanes
Aircraft first flown in 1922